Hidari is a genus of grass skipper butterflies in the family Hesperiidae.

Species
Hidari irava (Moore, [1858]) Sumatra to Bali, Malaya, Indochina.
Hidari doesoena Martin, 1895 Sumatra, Indochina
Hidari bhawani de Nicéville, [1889]  S. Vietnam.

Biology
The larvae of Hidari irava feed on Palmae including  Arenga, Caryota , Cocos, Elaeis , Livistona, Metroxylon, Nypa and Gramineae including Bambusa.

References

Natural History Museum Lepidoptera genus database
Funet

 
Hesperiinae
Hesperiidae genera